Lithuanians in the United Kingdom include individuals born in Lithuania who have migrated to the UK, among them Lithuanian citizens of Russian descent, as well as their British-born descendants. The 2011 UK Census recorded 95,730 Lithuanian-born residents in England, 1,353 in Wales, 4,287 in Scotland, and 7,341 in Northern Ireland. The previous, 2001 UK Census, had recorded 4,363 Lithuanian-born residents. The Office for National Statistics estimates that 144,000 Lithuanian-born immigrants were resident in the UK in 2013.

Significant numbers of Lithuanians have come to the UK since Lithuania's European Union accession in 2004; however, there have been historically notable Lithuanians communities in the UK since the early 20th century—most notably in Scotland (Glasgow and the mining communities of North Lanarkshire and Midlothian) and London. In Scotland, the first Lithuanians came during the latter part of the 19th century. Between 1886 and 1914, around one in four Lithuanians emigrated from Lithuania, with most of those leaving doing so in the 1890s and 1900s. Some of these emigrants were avoiding conscription into the Russian military, some were Lithuanian freedom fighters, others were Jews escaping persecution, and some were fleeing poverty. The Lithuanian population of Scotland is estimated to have grown from a few hundred to 7,000. An estimated 2,000 Lithuanians settled elsewhere in Britain during this period. Around 15,000 Lithuanians also resided in Scotland temporarily, before migrating onwards to other countries; most notably the United States. According to the BBC, some travelled to Scotland because they could not afford travel to the US, whereas others were duped, thinking that they had actually arrived in the United States.

Notable individuals

See also

 Baltic people in the United Kingdom
 Lithuanian people
 Lithuanians in Ireland

References

 
United Kingdom
United Kingdom
Immigration to the United Kingdom by country of origin